Eduarda Idalina "Duda" Amorim Taleska (born 23 September 1986) is a Brazilian-Hungarian former handball player. She played most of her career in Győr as a player of Győri Audi ETO KC. Her club number was 18.

She was voted World Handball Player of the Year 2014 by the International Handball Federation.

In an election made by the website Handball Planet, one of the most important in the Duda modality was elected as the best player in the world of the decade (2011/2020). In this same vote, through the popular vote, Duda was considered the best defender of the last ten years. She is widely regarded as one of the best handball players of all time.

Career

Club
Encouraged by her older sister, Amorim started to play handball at age 11 in the Colégio Barão do Rio Branco. She moved to Metodista/São Bernardo in 2002 after an invitation from Silvio Rodriguez, who spotted her during the youth games in Recife. She finished runner-up with her new team in that season.

Two years later, as a USCS/São Caetano player, Amorim won the São Paulo state junior championship and faced a marathon of matches as she played parallel for the youth, junior and adult teams.

She moved to Europe in February 2006, joining her sister in the Macedonian capital team Kometal Skopje. Eduarda spent three-and-a-half seasons with Kometal when the club faced heavy financial troubles and let some of their key players go to cut their expenses.

Amorim found her new home in Hungary, signing with Győri Audi ETO KC on 23 February 2009.

A five times EHF Champions League winner with Győr, Amorim obtained the premier continental club competition title in 2013, 2014, 2017, 2018 and 2019. In an online fans' poll launched by the European Handball Federation, she was chosen as the best left back of the competition in 2014.

International
The Brazilian left back won the gold medal on the 2007 Pan American Games, which was played on home soil. She also participated at the 2008 Summer Olympics in China, where the Brazilian team placed ninth, and the 2012 Summer Olympics, where Brazil finished sixth. In 2013, she won the World Championship and was elected the Most Valuable Player of the competition.

Achievements
 World Championship:
Winner: 2013
EHF Champions League:
Winner: 2013, 2014, 2017, 2018, 2019
Finalist:  2012, 2016
Semifinalist: 2010, 2011, 2021
Romanian Cup:
Winner: 2022
Nemzeti Bajnokság I:
Winner (10): 2009, 2010, 2011, 2012, 2013, 2014, 2016, 2017, 2018, 2019
Magyar Kupa:
Winner (11): 2009, 2010, 2011, 2012, 2013, 2014, 2015, 2016, 2018, 2019, 2021
Brazilian Championship:
Silver Medalist: 2002
 Macedonian Championship
Winner: 2005, 2006, 2007, 2008
 Macedonian Cup
Winner: 2005, 2006, 2007, 2008
 Pan American Championship:
Winner: 2007, 2011, 2017
Runners-up: 2009
 Pan American Games:
Winner: 2007, 2011, 2019

Awards and recognition
 IHF World Player of the Year: 2014
 EHF Player of the Year: 2019
 All-Star Left Back of the Junior World Championship: 2005
 MVP of the World Championship: 2013
 All-Star Left Back of the EHF Champions League: 2014
 Best Defender of the EHF Champions League: 2016, 2017, 2019, 2020, 2021
 Foreign Handballer of the Year in Hungary: 2014
 All-Star Left Back of the Pan American Championship: 2017
 Handball-Planet.com All-Star Defender of the Year: 2019
 Handball-Planet.com Player of the Decade: 2020

Personal life
Eduarda is the younger sister of Brazilian international handballer Ana Amorim. 
She got married in 2013.

References

External links

 
 
 
 
 Eduarda Amorim at Győri Audi ETO KC 

1986 births
Living people
People from Blumenau
Brazilian female handball players
Handball players at the 2008 Summer Olympics
Handball players at the 2012 Summer Olympics
Handball players at the 2016 Summer Olympics
Handball players at the 2007 Pan American Games
Handball players at the 2011 Pan American Games
Handball players at the 2019 Pan American Games
Olympic handball players of Brazil
Expatriate handball players
Brazilian expatriate sportspeople in North Macedonia
Brazilian expatriate sportspeople in Hungary
Győri Audi ETO KC players
Pan American Games medalists in handball
Pan American Games gold medalists for Brazil
Medalists at the 2007 Pan American Games
Medalists at the 2019 Pan American Games
Medalists at the 2011 Pan American Games
Handball players at the 2020 Summer Olympics
Sportspeople from Santa Catarina (state)